The 1981 Detroit Tigers season was the team's 81st season as a member of the American League. Games were suspended for 50 days due to the 1981 Major League Baseball strike, causing a split season. The Tigers finished the first half of the season in fourth place in the American League East, and the second half of the season tied for second place. Their overall record was 60 wins and 49 losses, and they outscored their opponents 427 to 404.  The Tigers drew 1,149,144 fans to their home games at Tiger Stadium, ranking fifth of the 14 teams in the American League.

Offseason 
 December 12, 1980: Dave Stegman was traded by the Tigers to the San Diego Padres for Dennis Kinney.
 January 13, 1981: Mike Sharperson was drafted by the Tigers in the 4th round of the 1981 Major League Baseball draft, but did not sign.
 March 29, 1981: Jim Lentine was released by the Tigers.

Regular season

Season standings

Record vs. opponents

Notable transactions 
 April 3, 1981: Chris Codiroli was released by the Tigers.
 April 3, 1981: Chuck Hensley was released by the Tigers.
 August 23, 1981: The Tigers traded a player to be named later to the Minnesota Twins for Ron Jackson. The Tigers completed the deal by sending Tim Corcoran to the Twins on September 4.

Roster

Player stats

Batting

Starters by position 
Note: Pos = Position; G = Games played; AB = At bats; H = Hits; Avg. = Batting average; HR = Home runs; RBI = Runs batted in

Other batters 
Note: G = Games played; AB = At bats; H = Hits; Avg. = Batting average; HR = Home runs; RBI = Runs batted in

Note: pitchers' batting statistics not included

Pitching

Starting pitchers 
Note: G = Games pitched; IP = Innings pitched; W = Wins; L = Losses; ERA = Earned run average; SO = Strikeouts

Other pitchers 
Note: G = Games pitched; IP = Innings pitched; W = Wins; L = Losses; ERA = Earned run average; SO = Strikeouts

Relief pitchers 
Note: G = Games pitched; W= Wins; L= Losses; SV = Saves; GF = Games finished; ERA = Earned run average; SO = Strikeouts

Awards and honors 
 Kirk Gibson, Tiger of the Year Award, from Detroit baseball writers
 Alan Trammell, AL Gold Glove Award, shortstop

1981 Major League Baseball All-Star Game
 Jack Morris, starter, pitcher

League top ten finishers 
Kirk Gibson
 #3 in AL in batting average (.328)
 #4 in AL in Power/Speed Number (11.8)

Steve Kemp
 #4 in AL in on-base percentage (.389)
 #3 in AL in bases on balls (70)
 #3 in AL in times on base (174)

Jack Morris
 MLB leader in wins (14) (tied with four others)
 MLB leader in bases on balls allowed (78)
 #2 in MLB in innings pitched (198)
 #2 in MLB in games started (25)
 #3 in AL in hits allowed per 9 innings pitched (6.95)
 #3 in MLB in complete games (15)
 #3 in MLB in batters faced (798)
 #6 in AL in home runs allowed (14)
 #9 in AL in earned runs allowed (67)

Lance Parrish
 #3 in AL in times grounded into double plays (16)

Kevin Saucier
 #5 in AL in saves (13)

Alan Trammell
 AL leader in sacrifice hits (16)

Lou Whitaker
 AL leader in games played (109)
 AL leader in games at second base (108)
 AL leader in innings at second base (918-1/3)
 AL leader in assists by a second baseman (354)

Milt Wilcox
 #5 in AL in games started (24)
 #5 in AL in hit batsmen (6)

Players ranking among top 100 all time at position 
The following members of the 1981 Detroit Tigers are among the Top 100 of all time at their position, as ranked by The Bill James Historical Baseball Abstract:
 Lance Parrish: 19th best catcher of all time
 Lou Whitaker: 13th best second baseman of all time 
 Alan Trammell: 9th best shortstop of all time 
 Kirk Gibson: 36th best left fielder of all time

Farm system

Notes

References 

 1981 Detroit Tigers Regular Season Statistics at Baseball Reference

Detroit Tigers seasons
Detroit Tigers season
Detroit Tiger
1981 in Detroit